Chris Thomas may refer to:

 Chris Thomas (American football) (born 1971), former wide receiver in the NFL
 Chris Thomas (basketball player) (born 1982), former men's basketball player for the University of Notre Dame
 Chris Thomas (basketball coach) (born 1980), American basketball coach
 Chris Thomas (cricketer) (born 1959), English cricketer
 Chris Thomas (record producer) (born 1947), music producer
 Chris Thomas King (born 1962), American blues musician who debuted as Chris Thomas
 Christopher Thomas (1818–1879), American politician and lawyer
 Chris D. Thomas (born 1959), professor of biology
 Chris Thomas Devlin, American screenwriter
 Christopher Thomas (born 1949), American mass murderer who killed 10 people in the Palm Sunday massacre

See also
 
 
 Christian Thomas (disambiguation)
 Cris Thomas, American white hat hacker and cyber security researcher
 Kris Thomas (born 1984), singer